Emese Béla (born 27 November 1958) is a retired Hungarian high jumper. Her personal best jump was 1.93 metres, achieved in August 1982 in Debrecen. She became Hungarian champion in 1981 and 1983.

Achievements

References

1958 births
Living people
Hungarian female high jumpers